The Chhandi River, or Chhandi Khola is a river in Nepal, a tributary of the Dordi River.

Hydrology

The Chhandi Khola is a tributary of the Dordi River, which in turn is a tributary of the Marsyangdi.

Hydroelectricity

The 2mW Chhandi Khola Small Hydropower Project is a run-of-the-river hydroelectricity plant in Phaleni and Bansar VDCs of Lamjung District.
Average annual energy is 11.2 GWh.

The 4mW Upper Chhandi Khola Small Hydropower, under construction in 2020, is another run-of-the-river hydroelectricity plant in Bansar and Phaleni VDCs of Lamjung District.
Projected average annual energy is 22.05 GWh.

Both plants are operated by Chhyandi Hydropower Co.

Notes

Sources

Rivers of Bagmati Province